Jane Munene-Murago is a Kenyan filmmaker, the first woman to study film in Kenya. Most of her films have been documentaries, produced through her company CineArts, on issues affecting women.

Life
In 1976 Munene studied at the government-run Kenya Institute of Mass Communication (KIMC), and was the only woman among KIMC's first year of graduates. Her first documentary, The Tender One (1979), was made with United Nations support as part of the International Year of the Child.

Unbroken Spirit (2011) is a portrait of Monica Wangu Wamwere, the mother of human rights activist Koigi wa Wamwere, who took part alongside Wangari Maathai in the 1992 Mothers' Hunger Strike to release political prisoners. The film was shown at the New York African Film Festival 2012.

Jane Murago-Munene is a former chair of the Kenya National Film Association. She is Executive Director of FEPACI.

Films
 The Tender One, 1979
 (with Dommie Yambo-Odotte) The Chosen One, 1991
 Women, Water, and Workload, 1994. 14-minute documentary.
 Enkishon: the Maasai Child in Kenya, 1995. 28-minute documentary.
 Out of Silence, 2000. 23-minute documentary.
 The Price of a Daughter, 2003.
 Behind Closed Doors, 2003. 
 Unbroken Spirit, 2011. Documentary

References

External links
 

Year of birth missing (living people)
Living people
Kenyan film directors
Kenyan women film directors
Kenyan film producers